The Perth Wildcats are an Australian professional basketball team based in Perth, Western Australia. The Wildcats compete in the National Basketball League (NBL) and play their home games at RAC Arena, known colloquially as "The Jungle".

After three years of strong lobbying to the NBL, the creation of a national basketball team in Perth finally occurred in 1982. The Westate Wildcats were established and played out of the 800-seat Perry Lakes Basketball Stadium. Interest in basketball steadily grew throughout the community and in 1984 the Westate Wildcats became the Perth Wildcats. The Wildcats have gone on to become the highest-drawing and most successful team in the league, having won NBL championships in 1990, 1991, 1995, 2000, 2010, 2014, 2016, 2017, 2019 and 2020, placing the team four ahead of Melbourne United, who has six championships. They are also the only team in NBL history to win championships in four different decades. Between 1987 and 2021, the Wildcats made the post-season 35 straight years, an accomplishment matched by no other professional sports team in Australia.

The Wildcats in Perth
The Wildcats are the city's only major professional basketball team and are one of Western Australia's major summer sport teams, along with the Perth Scorchers (cricket, Big Bash League), Western Warriors (cricket, Sheffield Shield), and Perth Glory (soccer, A-League). The public support for the Wildcats has been deemed remarkable, particularly the way fans have bought into the brand to create the "Red Army". The Wildcats' sturdy culture has long been built on a history of winning. In 2009, after being on the brink of bankruptcy, owner Jack Bendat and managing director Nick Marvin transformed the franchise, focusing on being family-friendly and engaging with children in Western Australia. Instead of doing 20 school visits per year, the Wildcats started doing 100. This increased to 200 school visits in 2010, and the year after it rose again to 220. As of 2019, the players had a 350-hour community engagement obligation, 200 hours above what the collective bargaining agreement requires. The pair introduced a zero-tolerance swearing policy and instructed players to always make eye contact and acknowledge supporters, with the philosophy being: the more engaged the Wildcats were with the West Australian community, the more fans they accumulated. As a result, they are the most successful franchise in NBL history and one of the most competitive professional sporting teams in the world, with crowds at Perth Arena the best and unmatched in the NBL. Marvin departed the club in 2017 while Bendat sold the club in 2021.

The Wildcats have consistently enjoyed large home crowds since moving into Perth Arena in 2012, resulting in arguably the greatest home-court advantage in the NBL. In January 2017, the Wildcats became the first NBL franchise to break the 10,000-member barrier. As a result of their large fan base, the Wildcats have set numerous record sell-out crowds at Perth Arena. A record crowd of 13,559 watched the Adelaide 36ers knock off the Wildcats 106–102 on 16 January 2015; that was later bested on 14 January 2017 when 13,611 people watched the Wildcats once again lose to the 36ers, this time by a margin of 95–84. A capacity crowd of 13,611 later attended Game 3 of the 2017 Grand Final series on 5 March 2017, matching the Wildcats' highest-attendance record. A capacity crowd of 13,611 attended the Wildcats vs Melbourne United match on 12 January 2018, marking the seventh time topping 13,000 at Perth Arena in 2017–18. The Wildcats went on to record the highest ever attendance for a team during an NBL season with 183,689 fans attending their home games during the 2017–18 regular season. A new official capacity crowd record of 13,615 attended the Wildcats vs Tasmania JackJumpers match on 19 December 2021.

Between 2012 and 2019, the team was forced on extended road trips for much of December due to Perth's annual hosting of the Hopman Cup at Perth Arena in early January.

When the Wildcats have won the NBL title, the team's victory celebration and ceremony has been held in the City of Perth at Forrest Place.

Franchise history

1982–1986: Early struggles

In 1979, the National Basketball League (NBL) in Australia was formed. It took another three years of lobbying by the Perth basketball community before a team in Western Australia became a reality. Formed in 1982 as the Westate Wildcats, the Wildcats became the first, and so far only, Western Australian team to compete in the NBL. The team's inaugural coach was Henry Daigle and the majority of the inaugural squad was made up of players from the East Perth Eagles, Stirling Senators and Perth Redbacks, led by captain Mike Ellis. They played out of Perry Lakes Basketball Stadium and finished the 1982 season in tenth place with a 10–16 win–loss record. Gordon Ellis took over as coach in 1983, as the team finished 13th with a 6–16 record.

In 1984, the team was renamed the Perth Wildcats, but success did not ensue under coach Lynn Massey as the team finished on the bottom of the ladder (16th) with only three wins. A fourth coach in Jay Brehmer came into the team for the 1985 season. Brehmer and imports Dan Clausen and Roland Brooks looked to lead the Wildcats to a finals berth for the first time, but they narrowly missed out on the post-season with a 13–13 record and an eighth-place finish. The Wildcats suffered a major setback in 1986 with the loss of Brooks, after he suffered a season-ending injury just 10 games into the season. Without their star import, the Wildcats struggled to be competitive as they finished the season in 12th place with an 8–18 record.

In 1986, Perth businessman Bob Williams bought the Wildcats and began to reshape the team's destiny.

1987: First finals and grand final
Many changes occurred in 1987. Most significantly, the team moved from the small confines of Perry Lakes Stadium to what was known in those days as the Perth Superdrome (now HBF Stadium). The Superdrome was capable of housing 5,000 people, compared to the 800-seat Perry Lakes Stadium. Also in 1987, still captained by Mike Ellis, the Perth Wildcats introduced players to the roster that would become household names such as Kendal Pinder, James Crawford, Cal Bruton (player/coach), Alan Black, Eric Watterson and Trevor Torrance.

The new talent paid off immediately for the Wildcats as the team made the finals for the first time. In the first two stages of the finals, the Wildcats defeated the Canberra Cannons and minor premier Adelaide 36ers to suddenly find themselves in the Grand Final series against the Brisbane Bullets. The Wildcats were repeatedly referred to as the 'Cinderella' story as they entered the season having finished in third-last position in 1986, only to go on to make the Grand Final after finishing the 1987 regular season in fourth position with a 19–7 record. The 'run, stun and have some fun' style of play that had been implemented that season had worked wonders until the Grand Final series. The series was a promoter's dream: East Coast versus West; solid fundamentals versus "run and gun"; future Hall of Fame members on both sides on the floor; and two coaches who couldn't stand each other (Brian Kerle versus Cal Bruton). The Bullets defeated the Wildcats by just one point in front of a sell-out Perth crowd in Game 1 of the three-match series, before claiming the Championship in Brisbane in Game 2 a few days later.

1990–2000: First Championship era

1990: First Championship
After 1988 and 1989 both resulted in losses to the North Melbourne Giants in the Semi-finals, the most exciting chapter in Wildcats history came in 1990 as prominent West Australian businessman Kerry Stokes became co-owner of the franchise and decided to raise the team's profile to incredible heights by moving the home court to the iconic 8,000-seat Perth Entertainment Centre.

After retiring as a player following the 1989 season, Cal Bruton became the Wildcats' general manager in 1990. Eager for the team to win its first NBL Championship, Bruton embarked on an active recruiting campaign during the off-season; a recruiting campaign that saw the introduction of a player that is regularly referred to as the Wildcats' greatest: Ricky 'Amazing' Grace. Grace teamed-up with Mike Ellis to create a dominating backcourt. The 1990 season began with turmoil as coach Alan Black was controversially fired after only two games, and was replaced by Cal Bruton. Despite the shaky start to the season, the Wildcats recovered to finish in fifth place with a 17–9 record. Entering the finals as underdogs, the Wildcats swept the Melbourne Tigers in the Elimination Finals and got their revenge over the North Melbourne Giants with a 2–1 victory in the Semi-finals to again face the Brisbane Bullets in their second Grand Final appearance.

Tens of thousands of people across Western Australia tuned into the live coverage to watch the Wildcats triumph 112–106 in Game 1 of the Grand Final series in front of a sold-out Perth Entertainment Centre. Brisbane tied the series at 1–1 after winning Game 2 in convincing fashion at home, 106–90. In the deciding game also in Brisbane a few days later, the Wildcats blew the game wide open in the third quarter and were up by 20 points before the final term. They cruised to a 109–86 victory to claim their first NBL Championship. For his superb series, Grace was recognised as grand final MVP. Over the three games, Grace averaged 24.7 points per game.

1991: Back-to-back championships
In controversial circumstances, Cal Bruton was not retained as coach despite leading the Wildcats to a championship in 1990. He was replaced by Murray Arnold, a former assistant coach with the Chicago Bulls. Arnold's style of game was focused on defence which was a significant change from the high scoring and entertaining style previously implemented under Bruton. In pursuit of back-to-back championships, the Wildcats strengthened their roster considerably in the off-season with the addition of future WA basketball legend Andrew Vlahov and Peter Hansen, an American who arrived via Venezuela, Spain and the Perry Lakes Hawks.

Arnold's Wildcats were a highly successful team, as they finished the regular season as minor premiers with a 22–4 record. After another successful regular season, the Wildcats entered the finals brimming with confidence. The Wildcats easily accounted for long-term rivals the Adelaide 36ers in the Semi-finals to then find themselves against the highly-rated Eastside Spectres in the Grand Final. The Wildcats had a unique opportunity to win back-to-back titles, a feat only achieved by two other teams to that point in the history of the NBL. Everything looked on track when the Wildcats were able to defeat the Spectres in Game 1 in Melbourne by 26 points (109–83). Perth had hit fever pitch and another sold-out crowd awaited the Wildcats for Game 2 back at home. However, with their backs against the wall, the Spectres performed with a never-say-die attitude and upset the favourites at home by five points (86–81). Game 2 was played on a Friday night and Game 3 was scheduled for Sunday, leaving the Wildcats little time to formulate a new strategy. However, in front of an electric Perth crowd, the Wildcats were victorious in the deciding third game by 10 points (90–80) and became the third team in history to win back-to-back NBL Championships. Hansen was named MVP of the Grand Final series after averaging 17.3 points per game over the three games.

Just as Mike Ellis had hoped, he and the likes of Pinder, Crawford, Grace and Vlahov found themselves in the midst of a Perth Wildcats dynasty.

1993: Fourth Grand Final in seven years
After a down year in 1992 produced a quarter-final loss, three major personnel changes occurred heading into the 1993 season. Club legend and captain Mike Ellis retired after 12 seasons, Dr Adrian Hurley was appointed as the new head coach replacing Murray Arnold, and finally the Wildcats enticed two-time league MVP Scott Fisher to the team.

With new captain Andrew Vlahov at the helm, the Wildcats continued their on-court success to finish as minor premiers and make it through to another Grand Final series, this time against a Melbourne Tigers team led by Andrew Gaze, Lanard Copeland and Mark Bradtke. The impending series is often described as the best Grand Final series in the history of the NBL. After splitting the first two games of the series, the championship came down to the final few seconds of Game 3 when Vlahov missed a three-point shot to tie the game with only seconds remaining. Despite being on the losing team, Ricky Grace was named the MVP of the series after averaging 22.3 points per game over the three games.

1995: Third Championship

Following a disappointing 1994 season, the Wildcats looked to recruit a pure sharp shooter to stretch opposing defenses and free up more room in the low post for the likes of Scott Fisher, James Crawford and Andrew Vlahov to operate in. Anthony Stewart was signed from the Hobart Tassie Devils to fill this role. Joining Stewart in the backcourt was Ricky Grace and Aaron Trahair, while Martin Cattalini rounded out the eight-man rotation used by coach Adrian Hurley.

The Wildcats were highly successful in 1995, as coach Hurley guided the team to what was referred to as the 'Triple Crown'—winning the pre-season competition, finishing minor premiers and then winning the NBL Championship. After defeating the Melbourne Tigers in the quarter-finals and the Adelaide 36ers in the Semi-finals, the Wildcats won through to their fifth Grand Final in nine years. In a rollercoaster Grand Final series against the North Melbourne Giants, both teams won away contests to be level coming into the deciding Game 3. The Wildcats went on to overpower the Giants in Game 3 and recorded a comfortable 108–88 victory in claiming their third NBL title. Captain Andrew Vlahov was named MVP of the Grand Final series after averaging 24 points per game over the three games.

The Wildcats' championship win booked themselves a trip to London to play in the McDonald's Championship, an international tournament featuring the best clubs in the world. The Wildcats lost to the Houston Rockets 116–72 in their first game of the tournament, but managed to defeat Real Madrid 93–86 in their second game.

1999–2000: Fourth Championship
Following four straight injury-plagued seasons that all resulted in early finals exists, the Wildcats geared up for a big season in 1999–2000 behind coach Alan Black and stalwarts Andrew Vlahov, Ricky Grace, Scott Fisher and Anthony Stewart, as well as the up-and-coming James Harvey and two-year centre Paul Rogers. In a boost for the Wildcats mid-season, the team signed import Marcus Timmons for their run to the finals.

Prior to the season, Perth Wildcats owner Kerry Stokes decided to pass on the reins of the franchise to basketball great Luc Longley, fresh off being a three-time NBA championship winner with the Chicago Bulls, and Andrew Vlahov. The new ownership duo proved to be an instant success with the Wildcats securing an unprecedented fourth championship, defeating the Victoria Titans in front of a capacity crowd of 8,000 at the Perth Entertainment Centre. The Wildcats swept the Grand Final series 2–0, winning Game 1 in Melbourne 84–78 before returning home to clinch the series with an 83–76 Game 2 win. After scoring a game-high 27 points in Game 2, Marcus Timmons was named MVP of the series. To top off the season, Paul Rogers became the first Wildcat to be honoured as the regular-season MVP.

2000–2009: Championship drought
The 2000s saw the Wildcats go on a championship drought. Following the closure of the Perth Entertainment Centre, the Wildcats moved back in to their old home, the Superdrome (now HBF Stadium), for the 2002–03 season. The 8,000-seat Perth Entertainment Centre was a popular venue for the Wildcats thanks to its central CBD location. The Superdrome, or Challenge Stadium as it became known, was a suburban-based arena and could only hold 5,000 people.

The 2002–03 season saw the Wildcats play in their seventh Grand Final series behind Ricky Grace and coach Alan Black. In the championship series, the Wildcats were outclassed by the Sydney Kings, as they lost Game 1 in Sydney 98–94 before returning home and losing 117–101 in Game 2. In addition to Grace, Alan Black's son, Stephen Black, was also an important member of the Wildcats' 2003 grand final team, as was Tony Ronaldson, Rob Feaster, Matthew Burston, Brett Wheeler and James Harvey.

In the days following their grand final loss to the Kings, the Wildcats decided not to renew Black's contract and parted ways with him for a second time. Club legend Mike Ellis was appointed head coach for the 2003–04 season, but in his lone season as coach of the Wildcats, Ellis guided the team to their first losing season since 1986, as they finished in seventh spot with a 15–18 record and earned a quarter-final defeat. Ellis was replaced for the 2004–05 season by another former player, Scott Fisher. In addition, co-owner Luc Longley relinquished his majority share of the Wildcats in April 2004, leaving Andrew Vlahov as the sole owner of the franchise. The 2004–05 season saw the end of an era as captain Ricky Grace retired as a four-time NBL champion and a 15-year member of the Wildcats.

With Grace retired, the 2005–06 season saw the introduction of future club legend Shawn Redhage while West Australian businessman Jack Bendat became the chairman and majority shareholder of the franchise. Although no longer the majority shareholder, Andrew Vlahov remained in control of the team as managing director. Bendat assumed full control in 2007.

The Wildcats celebrated their 25th anniversary in 2006–07 and recorded 23 wins. The Wildcats fell short in the finals in both 2007 and 2008, with Connor Henry replacing Scott Fisher for the 2008–09 season. Another early finals exist led to Henry's tenure lasting only one season.

2009–2021: Second Championship era

2009–10: Fifth Championship
Following the 2008–09 season, the Wildcats came within weeks of folding unless they raised a million dollars in sponsorship. The NBL itself was also in strife; with the competition falling on tough times, there was a real possibility at the time that there would be no league in 2009–10. Collaborating with other clubs, the Wildcats helped reform the league. Of all the teams in the NBL, the Wildcats underwent the greatest transformation. Under the guidance of managing director Nick Marvin, the club slashed $1.5 million worth of staff and hired a new coach, Rob Beveridge. The Wildcats also partnered with the WA Government to promote its 'Alcohol: Think again' initiative. Meanwhile, the NBL made significant changes to the competition. One of Basketball Australia's moves for the 2009–10 season was to return the NBL game to a 40-minute format from the 48-minutes it adopted in 1984, ostensibly to accommodate the international game. This was done to bring Australia back in step with the rest of the world (outside the NBA) and to be more attractive to television as a package because a 40-minute game slots well into a two-hour timeslot.

Beveridge was instrumental in compiling a new-look team where Shawn Redhage, Stephen Weigh and Brad Robbins were surrounded by proven NBL players Damian Martin, Drew Williamson, Luke Schenscher and Martin Cattalini, and rising stars Kevin Lisch and Jesse Wagstaff. Paul Rogers relinquished the captaincy heading into the 2009–10 season, handing over the reins to Redhage. Import Galen Young was acquired mid season to replace Rogers, who succumbed to a career-ending injury. After claiming the minor premiership and beating the Gold Coast Blaze in the Semi-finals, the Wildcats came up against the Wollongong Hawks in their first Grand Final series since 2003. After Games 1 and 2 proved to be comfortable victories for each home team, the Wildcats found themselves down by as many as 11 points in the second quarter of Game 3, before Lisch exploded offensively to finish with 29 points in lifting the team to a record fifth NBL Championship with a 96–72 win. Lisch was subsequently named MVP of the series.

2011–2013: Back-to-back Grand Final defeats
Following what was a season crippled by serious injuries to Jesse Wagstaff, Matthew Knight and Shawn Redhage in 2010–11, the Wildcats looked to get back on top in 2011–12 with the addition of 7'2" centre Luke Nevill. In a pleasing move, Redhage returned to action in 2011–12 after it was initially feared he'd possibly never play again following his injury in 2010–11. Perth had its heart and soul torn out in January 2011 when, for the first time in his career, co-captain Shawn Redhage was injured. The six-time club MVP lunged for a contested ball in a way that punched the head of his femur through his pelvis, breaking the bone and dislocating the joint.

The 2011–12 season saw the Wildcats jostle over top spot for the majority of the season with the New Zealand Breakers. The two teams went on to meet in the Grand Final, where the Breakers defeated the Wildcats in three games. Game 2 of the series saw Redhage force a third and deciding game with a final-second block on Breakers star C. J. Bruton. In his third season in Perth, Lisch took home the Andrew Gaze Trophy as the league's MVP, making him just the second Wildcat to achieve the honour.

In late 2012, the state-of-the-art Perth Arena was finally completed, with the 13 and half thousand seat stadium becoming the brand new home of the Wildcats starting with the 2012–13 season. However, injuries and retirements threatened to destabilise the season. With an injury to Matthew Knight early in the season, Michael Dunigan was brought in as a short-term replacement. Dunigan quickly became a fan-favourite with an array of blocks and crowd-pleasing dunks. Co-captain Brad Robbins abruptly retired just eight games into the season, sighting he had lost motivation and passion for the game, while Cameron Tovey announced in March that the 2012–13 season would be his last in the NBL. Despite the turmoil, the Wildcats finished second in 2012–13 and made their way through to yet another Grand Final series, where they had a re-match against the New Zealand Breakers. However, the Wildcats were dealt a major blow when Damian Martin was ruled out of the grand final series with an Achilles injury. Brad Robbins was subsequently rushed back into the team to take Martin's place, but without their floor general and defensive specialist, the Wildcats were dealt a 2–0 sweep from a Breakers side that won their third consecutive championship in 2013.

2013–14: Sixth Championship
After falling at the final hurdle two years in a row, the Wildcats went about developing a new look squad and style that would seriously challenge for a sixth NBL title in 2013–14. The 2013 off-season saw the departure of Rob Beveridge (coach), Kevin Lisch (shooting guard) and Cameron Tovey (small forward). As a result, the Wildcats appointed Trevor Gleeson as head coach, and signed two new imports in small forward James Ennis and shooting guard Jermaine Beal. The trio joined the team with the core group of players—new captain Damian Martin, Shawn Redhage, Jesse Wagstaff, Matthew Knight and Greg Hire—still intact. Further additions to Gleeson's new squad included centre Tom Jervis and guards Drake U'u and Erik Burdon.

James Ennis was a prized recruit for the Wildcats and his agreement with the team was well documented, with the Miami Heat holding his draft rights and being able to recall him at any time. He opened the season with a 25-point effort against the Adelaide 36ers—the most points scored by a Wildcat on NBL debut at the time. Ennis helped the new-look Wildcats dominate the NBL with an 8–0 start to the season, a start which ultimately culminated in a 21–7 overall record and a minor premiership. His high-flying dunks and athleticism enthralled the entire league, as he proved to be a top MVP candidate alongside Melbourne Tigers guard Chris Goulding and the eventual winner, Rotnei Clarke of the Wollongong Hawks.

The Wildcats cruised to their 11th Grand Final appearance with a 2–0 Semi-final series win over the Wollongong Hawks. After knocking out the Hawks in straight sets, the Wildcats faced historical rivals the Adelaide 36ers in the 2014 Grand Final. After winning Game 1 in Perth on the back of a 30-point effort from Ennis, the 36ers forced a deciding third game with an 89–84 win in Game 2. In Game 3 less than 48 hours later, the Wildcats crushed the 36ers with a 93–59 win, as their 2–1 series victory saw them claim their sixth NBL Championship. Beal was subsequently named the series MVP after Ennis struggled to make an impact in Games 2 and 3. Beal averaged 17.6 points per game during the Grand Final series, hitting 11 three-pointers at an efficient 48%.

2015–16: Seventh Championship
After an injury-riddled season in 2014–15 saw the Wildcats earn a Semi-final defeat, coach Trevor Gleeson was confident heading into the 2015–16 season that he had assembled the right blend of players, after conceding his side struggled with chemistry issues in 2014–15. A banged-up Perth was swept out of the playoffs in 2015 following a fourth-place finish which marked an underwhelming follow-up to its title-winning campaign in 2014. Gleeson made a conscious effort during the 2015 off-season to make sure that first and foremost, the chemistry is right. Following a large player turnover, the Wildcats were confident high-profile recruits Casey Prather and Nate Jawai – as well as back-up guard Jarrod Kenny – would be strong fits among the group dynamic.

The Wildcats were relatively injury-free in 2015–16 and finished the regular season in second place with an 18–10 record. By qualifying for the finals in 2016, the Wildcats set a record with their 30th straight season of playing finals basketball. With Jawai's presence inside, Prather's athleticism, tough defence and ability to finish at the rim and Kenny being able support captain Damian Martin admirably, they provided improvement in crucial areas. Alongside the core of Martin, Redhage, Wagstaff, Knight, Hire, Beal and Jervis, the Wildcats were successful in reaching the Grand Final, where they defeated the New Zealand Breakers in three games led by captain and Grand Final MVP Damian Martin.

2016–17: Back-to-back championships

The 2016 off-season saw a lot of change in personnel, with three key players from the 2015–16 championship team moving on—Nate Jawai, Tom Jervis and Jermaine Beal. To replace them, coach Trevor Gleeson brought in Angus Brandt, Jameel McKay and Jaron Johnson, and headed into the 2016–17 season attempting to secure the team's first back-to-back championships since 1991.

The Wildcats started the season with a 4–1 record but then slumped to last place on the ladder in December with a 7–9 record. Injuries to Damian Martin, Jarrod Kenny and Matthew Knight were a contributing factor, as was the recruiting. Import Jaron Johnson was released for a second in December after he was first axed just three games into the season in order to bring in three-point specialist Andre Ingram. But when Ingram returned home less than a week after arriving, citing mental issues, Johnson was reinstated but then let go again as the Wildcats turned their attention to a new point guard. The Wildcats were under siege when they slumped to the bottom of the ladder at Christmas, but a win on New Year's Eve against the Illawarra Hawks and the signing of Bryce Cotton in January turned the season around. They won eight of their remaining twelve regular season games, including two must-win encounters in the final week to squeeze into the finals. From there, the Wildcats rolled through the Finals undefeated. The finals streak extended to a record 31st straight season and the 3–0 Grand Final sweep of the Illawarra Hawks saw them claim their eighth NBL Championship. The Wildcats went back-to-back for the first time since 1990/1991, while Gleeson became the first coach to guide the Wildcats to back-to-back championships. In addition, series MVP Byrce Cotton placed his name in the NBL record books with a Grand Final performance that was arguably the greatest in the league's history. Cotton's Game 3 performance was unprecedented—he scored 45 points, the most ever scored in an NBL Grand Final game, breaking a 29-year-old record. His 27.7 points per game over the Grand Final series marked the most from any player in 20 years. Club legend Shawn Redhage retired as a four-time championship player. In addition to his six club MVP awards, Redhage departed the NBL as one of the Wildcats' all-time great players. He finished his illustrious NBL career with 393 games to his name—380 with the Perth Wildcats (second on the team's all-time games-played list)—while finishing with 5,819 points and 2,153 rebounds.

2017–18
The Wildcats reacquired the services of Grand Final MVP Bryce Cotton for the 2017–18 season, but lost two-time Club MVP Casey Prather to Melbourne United. The team's initial replacement for Prather was Devondrick Walker, but after Walker sustained a foot injury in August, the Wildcats replaced him with J. P. Tokoto. Other changes to the roster included Derek Cooke Jr. coming in to replace the outgoing Jameel McKay, and Lucas Walker stepping up from a training player role to a full-time squad member in place of the retired Shawn Redhage. The rest of the local contingent remained the same, including Matt Knight, who announced that the 2017–18 season would be his last. However, following three early-season head knocks, Knight brought forth his retirement in early November to join Redhage in retirement.

The Wildcats started the season with a 10–3 record, before dropping to 13–9 in mid-January. They finished the regular season in third place with a 16–12 record. On the eve of their finals campaign, Cotton was named league MVP, becoming just the third Wildcat to win the award after Paul Rogers (2000) and Kevin Lisch (2012). In addition, Cotton earned All-NBL First Team honours, Tokoto earned All-NBL Second Team honours, and Martin was named the NBL's Best Defensive Player—earning the honour for a record-breaking sixth time. In Game 1 of their semi-finals series against the second-seeded Adelaide 36ers, the Wildcats were defeated 109–74, thus recording their second biggest finals loss in club history. The only time the Wildcats have lost by a larger margin in their 32-year finals streak was in 1989 when they lost to North Melbourne by 55 points. The Wildcats went on to lose 89–88 to the 36ers in Game 2 to bow out of the finals.

2018–19: Ninth Championship

The 2018 off-season saw the Wildcats secure Bryce Cotton to a three-year deal, while acquiring the services of Nick Kay and Mitch Norton from the Illawarra Hawks. While losing championship trio Lucas Walker, Jarrod Kenny and Dexter Kernich-Drew to the Cairns Taipans, former two-time championship Wildcat Tom Jervis returned to Perth after spending the previous two seasons with the Brisbane Bullets. They also signed import Terrico White and elevated four-year development player Rhys Vague to the full-time roster. The team travelled to the United States for two pre-season games against NBA teams Utah Jazz and Denver Nuggets. where they were handed a 130–72 loss to the Jazz in their first match. This loss was cited by coach Trevor Gleeson as the catalyst to the season's success. The Wildcats started the season with a 10–1 record despite Martin, Brandt, White and Cotton being out for various periods of time with injuries. By mid-January however, the Wildcats had fallen to 12–9 after losing eight out of 10 games, leading to increasing external pressure urging them to make changes to their roster and bring in a third import. The organisation and coaches instead backed the playing group to return to form and enjoy success in the latter part of the season. In response, the team bounced back with three straight wins over Melbourne, Adelaide and Sydney, seeing them move to 15–9 and atop the ladder by late January. They won the next three as well, and despite a regular-season finale loss to Melbourne and being without Norton since 25 January with a calf injury, the Wildcats finished as minor premiers with an 18–10 record. They went on to defeat the Bullets 2–0 in the semi-finals to advance through to their 14th NBL Grand Final series, where behind Grand Final MVP Terrico White, the Wildcats defeated Melbourne United 3–1 to claim their ninth NBL championship, hoisting the trophy on the back of 11 wins from their final 13 games. Having only secured the title interstate once before—in 1990—the Wildcats' win in Melbourne was only the fourth grand final road win for any NBL team since 2009.

2019–20: Tenth Championship
The first move of the 2019 off-season was the re-signing of four-time championship-winning coach Trevor Gleeson, who was retained by the Wildcats on a three-year deal. Next saw the re-signing of five-time championship-winning duo Damian Martin and Jesse Wagstaff, which was followed by the retention of six others from the championship-winning roster, including the return of import Terrico White. Wagstaff took on the role of vice captain for the 2019–20 season following the retirement of Greg Hire, who was replaced on the roster by Wani Swaka Lo Buluk, who was elevated to the full-time squad after spending the 2018–19 season as a development player. To replace the outgoing Angus Brandt and Tom Jervis, the Wildcats signed two new centres in import Dario Hunt and West Australian Majok Majok. The team also had a change in both assistant coaching positions with Paul Woolpert and Jacob Chance replacing the outgoing Matthew Nielsen and Adam Forde.

During pre-season, the Wildcats lost Swaka Lo Buluk to an ankle injury that saw him miss the first 17 games of the season. He was temporarily replaced in the squad by development player Nic Pozoglou. Early in the season, assistant coach Paul Woolpert, who had previously served under Gleeson during the 2014–15 season, was forced to return to the United States due to personal issues, which led to former NBA player and long-time coach Scott Roth stepping in to fill the void of lead assistant.

The team started the season with a 5–1 record, before slipping to 8–5 by the end of round 10 following back-to-back losses. Their losses over their first 13 games included a 23-point margin against the Cairns Taipans and a 19-point margin against the Sydney Kings. This culminated in a 99–88 loss to the Adelaide 36ers at home in round 10, with the game being over when the visitors led by 27 points during the third quarter. This loss followed a dramatic drop off in the final quarter against Cairns in round nine when Perth gave up a 12-point lead to lose by seven points. The team responded with four straight wins and closed out December with a 13–6 record. However, they lost Martin for the entire month of January after he suffered a left heel injury in the final game of 2019. After losing back-to-back games to start January 2020, Gleeson and the Wildcats decided to release Dario Hunt and replace him with seven-year NBA veteran Miles Plumlee. With seven games remaining in the season, Plumlee had to play all seven games to qualify for the finals. Due to the demanding schedule, the Wildcats had played 12 of their first 21 games away from Perth. Plumlee's debut game also came on the road, before the team closed out the season with five of their final six games being at home. Following the addition of Plumlee, the Wildcats won six of seven games to secure a 34th consecutive finals appearance with a second-place finish and a 19–9 record.

In the semi-finals, the Wildcats defeated the Cairns Taipans 2–1 to advance through to their 15th NBL Grand Final. In the grand final series, the Wildcats took Game 1 in Sydney before the Kings levelled the series with a win in Perth. The Wildcats went on to take a 2–1 series lead with a win in Game 3 in Sydney. Due to the coronavirus outbreak, it was decided that Games 2–5 would take place behind closed doors. Following Game 3 however, the Kings refused to take part in the final two games of the series, withdrawing citing health and safety concerns. As a result of a series cancellation and with Perth up 2–1, the NBL declared the Wildcats the champions for the 2019–20 season, thus claiming their 10th NBL championship. After averaging 30.0 points, 6.0 rebounds and 4.7 assists over the three games, Cotton was named Grand Final MVP for the second time in four years, becoming the first player in Wildcats history to be named league MVP, Grand Final MVP and win a championship all in the same season.

2020–21: 16th Grand Final
Heading into an uncertain off-season due to the COVID-19 pandemic, the NBL decided to reduce a roster spot and an import position for all teams while also introducing pay cuts on player contracts for the 2020–21 season.

While the Wildcats retained the services of Bryce Cotton on a three-year deal, they lost six-time champion and seven-year captain Damian Martin to retirement. With the loss of Nick Kay and Terrico White, the Wildcats acquired NBL veteran Todd Blanchfield and rookie import John Mooney. They also picked up Jarred Bairstow with Rhys Vague departing, and signed Kevin White to fill the empty guard position left by Martin. A preseason injury to centre Majok Majok also saw the club bring back former champion Wildcat Tom Jervis. A major off-season development was the pending Australian citizenship of Cotton and the potential of not having him classed as an import player; the Wildcats reportedly had Miles Plumlee locked in to return, but this did not eventuate due to the citizenship not being approved. Additionally, Jesse Wagstaff was named Martin's replacement as captain.

Preseason games commenced in December 2020, with the regular season scheduled for a January 2021 start. Following a trip to Brisbane to play preseason games against the Bullets, the Wildcats were forced into 14-day quarantine upon returning to Perth due to Brisbane's COVID cluster that led to state border closures. They were subsequently forced to sit out Round 1 of the regular season, with their season opener on 24 January in Round 2 seeing them defeat the South East Melbourne Phoenix at home 88–86. COVID forced home games three and four to be postponed, which was followed by the Wildcats relocating out of Western Australia until the completion of the NBL Cup. They went on to win the inaugural NBL Cup with a 7–1 record over the eight Cup games, having been away from Perth for six weeks. On 8 April, the Wildcats extended their winning streak to nine games with a 73–69 victory over the Sydney Kings. It marked the first nine-game win streak in a season for the Wildcats since January 2001. To finish the regular season, the Wildcats signed former Brisbane Bullets centre Will Magnay, but lost Cotton for the rest of the campaign with a leg injury. They finished second with a 25–11 record and qualified for their 35th consecutive finals series. In game one of the semi-final series against the Illawarra Hawks, the Wildcats lost 74–72 despite a game-high 24 points from Blanchfield. They won game two 79–71 and then game three also by a 79–71 margin to advance to their 16th NBL Grand Final. In game one of the grand final series against Melbourne United, the Wildcats lost 73–70 despite a game-high 27 points from Blanchfield. They went on to lose game two 83–74 and game three 81–76 to fall 3–0 in the series, with Melbourne winning the championship. The series saw the Wildcats hampered by injuries to Luke Travers, Clint Steindl and Mitch Norton.

2021–present: New ownership

2021–22: Finals streak ended
The 2021 off-season saw Sports Entertainment Group take over from Jack Bendat as owner of the Wildcats, while five-time championship-winning coach Trevor Gleeson departed for the NBA. Canadian Scott Morrison took over from Gleeson as head coach. The 2021–22 roster saw the return of Bryce Cotton and Majok Majok from injury, while Jesse Wagstaff, Mitch Norton, Todd Blanchfield, Kevin White and Luke Travers also continued on. New additions included imports Vic Law and Michael Frazier II, alongside Jack Purchase and Matt Hodgson. John Mooney departed for Japan, while Jarred Bairstow, Will Magnay and Clint Steindl all joined new NBL franchise the Tasmania JackJumpers.

The pre-season saw major knee injuries to both Blanchfield and Norton. Despite further injuries to Frazier and Hodgson, the Wildcats won their season opener 85–73 over the Adelaide 36ers. Law's 37 points set the highest score ever by a player in their Perth Wildcats debut, surpassing James Crawford's previous record of 33 points in 1987. The Wildcats went 4–1 over their first five games, which were all at home, before leaving Western Australia permanently and playing exclusively on the road for over two months due to the state's border restrictions. They moved to 7–2 by late January before dropping to 8–6 by late February. They won their next five games to conclude their away matches for the regular season as they entered a nine-game home stretch. After going 3–6 over their final nine games, which included Law missing the final two due to a season-ending ankle injury, the Wildcats' 35-year finals streak came to end as they finished fifth with a 16–12 record.

2022–23 season: Return to finals

Following the departure of Scott Morrison after one season due to family reasons, the Wildcats hired former NBL player John Rillie as head coach. New import big man duo TaShawn Thomas and Brady Manek were accompanied by former New Zealand Breakers guard Corey Webster, while 2022 NBA draft pick Luke Travers returned to the Wildcats for another season. Bryce Cotton, Majok Majok, Jesse Wagstaff, Mitch Norton and Todd Blanchfield all returned, while Kyle Zunic and Corey Shervill were elevated from development players to the main roster. The front office also experienced turnover of long-time staff while game day changes caused a stir amongst fans early in the season.

After starting the season with three straight wins, the Wildcats lost their next five. It marked the first time since 2005 that the Wildcats recorded five consecutive losses. Over the next eight games, the Wildcats went 6–2. Following a New Year's Eve win, the Wildcats released Shervill in order to sign Corey Webster's brother, Tai Webster. Tai's addition led to the reduced minutes of Blanchfield and Norton. On 14 January 2023, the Wildcats played the Adelaide 36ers in the first ever open-air game at RAC Arena, with Perth winning 112–97. Going into the regular-season finale on 5 February, the Wildcats required an 11-point victory to clinch a finals spot. They subsequently defeated the Sydney Kings 96–84 to earn sixth place with a 15–13 record.

In the Play-In Qualifier against the South East Melbourne Phoenix, the Wildcats won 106–99 behind Cotton's game-high 26 points and a 41-point fourth quarter. In the Play-In Game three days later, the Wildcats bowed out of the finals with a 91–78 loss to the Cairns Taipans.

Season by season

Summary

After three years of finals action that included a losing grand final series in 1987, the team won back-to-back titles in 1990 and 1991 behind the likes of Ricky Grace, James Crawford and Mike Ellis, and coaches Cal Bruton and Murray Arnold. It took four more years for the team's third NBL title in 1995, with coach Adrian Hurley and captain Andrew Vlahov leading the way. Five more years elapsed before the next championship came in the 1999/2000 season. Behind coach Alan Black and centre Paul Rogers, and veterans Vlahov, Grace and Scott Fisher still around, the Wildcats won their fourth title.

A large championship drought occurred between 2000/01 and 2008/09, but the Wildcats still made the finals each season. Then in 2009/10, the Wildcats became the undisputed greatest NBL franchise with a fifth championship. Coach Rob Beveridge and import Kevin Lisch were instrumental to the team's success that season, as was Shawn Redhage and Damian Martin.

Their sixth championship came in 2013/14 thanks to coach Trevor Gleeson and imports Jermaine Beal and James Ennis. Their seventh championship came the next season in 2015/16, as coach Gleeson became the first Wildcats coach to win multiple championships. With their eighth title coming in 2016/17, the Wildcats won back-to-back championships for the first time since 1990/1991, while Gleeson became the first coach to guide the Wildcats to consecutive championships. In 2017, four-time championship-winning trio Damian Martin, Shawn Redhage and Jesse Wagstaff equaled Ricky Grace's franchise record of winning four championships. In 2019, Martin and Wagstaff became the only players in NBL history to win five championships at the one club. Martin and Wagstaff picked up their sixth championship rings in 2020, joining C. J. Bruton and David Stiff as the NBL's only six-time champions and the only players to be able to do that at one club. Additionally, Gleeson attained his fifth NBL championship, making him the second-most successful coach in league history behind six-time winner Brian Goorjian.

Finals appearance record (1987–2021)
The Perth Wildcats' run of 35 straight NBL finals appearances between 1987 and 2021 is unmatched in major Australian professional sports. The most consecutive finals reached in VFL/AFL football is 13 by the Hawthorn Football Club between 1982 and 1994, while the NRL's St. George Illawarra Dragons made 23 consecutive finals appearances between 1951 and 1973.

In the major North American sports, the Edmonton Eskimos of the Canadian Football League qualified for the playoffs for 34 consecutive years between 1972 and 2005. In American sport, the Boston Bruins of the National Hockey League made 29 consecutive playoff appearances between 1967/68 and 1995/96, while the Philadelphia 76ers (as the Syracuse Nationals) and San Antonio Spurs both made the NBA playoffs 22 straight seasons.

Israeli professional basketball club Maccabi Tel Aviv holds the world record of 40 straight post-season appearances, with their 41st appearance coming in 2021/22.

Arena history
 Perry Lakes Basketball Stadium (1982–1986)
 Perth Superdrome / Challenge Stadium (1987–1989, 2002–2012)
 Perth Entertainment Centre (1990–2002)
 Burswood Dome (1994; 2004)
 RAC Arena (2012–present)

Players
See also: Perth Wildcats Complete Player List

Current roster

Notable players

  Jermaine Beal
  Angus Brandt
  C. J. Bruton
  Cal Bruton
  Martin Cattalini
  Bryce Cotton
  James Crawford
 / Sunday Dech
  Mike Ellis
  Scott Fenton
  Scott Fisher
  Chris Goulding
  Ricky Grace
  Greg Hire
  Nathan Jawai
  Tom Jervis
  Nick Kay
  Jarrod Kenny
  Matt Knight
  Vic Law
  Kevin Lisch
  Luc Longley
 / Majok Majok
  Damian Martin
  Jameel McKay
  John Mooney
  Mitch Norton
  Kendal Pinder
  Miles Plumlee
  Casey Prather
  Shawn Redhage
  Brad Robbins
  Paul Rogers
  Tony Ronaldson
  Liam Rush
  Clint Steindl
  Anthony Stewart
  Wani Swaka Lo Buluk
  Luke Travers
 / Drake U'u
  Andrew Vlahov
  Jesse Wagstaff
  Lucas Walker
  Eric Watterson
  Terrico White

Retired numbers

Notes:
 1 Scott Fenton's No. 14 singlet was retired following his death in a car crash on 21 August 1989

30th Anniversary All-Star Team
On 4 February 2013, the Wildcats announced their 30th Anniversary All-Star Team.

Coach: Adrian Hurley
General Manager: Cal Bruton

40th Anniversary Team
In February 2022, the Wildcats announced their 40th Anniversary Team.

Coach: Trevor Gleeson

Honour roll 

Source: Perth Wildcats Achievements

Games against NBA teams

References

External links 

 
 "Growing up out West" at nbl.com.au
 "Are the Wildcats Australia's Greatest Sporting Team?" at nbl.com.au
 "Outgoing Perth Wildcats boss Nick Marvin seeks new challenge after 11 years with NBL club" at perthnow.com.au
 "Perth Wildcats’ saviour Jack Bendat hails ninth title as best of the lot" at perthnow.com.au
 "Perth Wildcats' winning culture the envy of every sporting organisation" at thewest.com.au

 
National Basketball League (Australia) teams
Sporting clubs in Perth, Western Australia
Basketball teams in Western Australia
Basketball teams established in 1982
1982 establishments in Australia